Anastasia Yuryevna Grebenkina (born 18 January 1979) is a former competitive ice dancer. She is best known for her partnership with Vazgen Azrojan with whom she represented Armenia at the 2006 Winter Olympics and won the bronze medal at the 2005 NHK Trophy.

Career 
Grebenkina teamed up with Vazgen Azrojan in 1996 and skated with him until 1998, representing Russia. After their partnership ended, she skated with Vitali Novikov, also representing Russia.

Grebenkina and Azrojan reformed their partnership in 2002, this time representing Armenia. They became the first skaters to medal for Armenia at a Grand Prix event, obtaining bronze at the NHK Trophy in 2005. They competed at the 2006 Winter Olympics, finishing 20th.

In September 2006, Grebenkina / Azrojan changed coaches, moving from Alexei Gorshkov to Alexander Zhulin. At the 2006 Cup of China, Grebenkina cut her leg with her own blade during practice, requiring stitches, but was able to compete and finished 6th with Azrojan. The duo retired from competition in 2008. She coaches at Moscow's Gorky Park.

In 2007, Grebenkina played Maria Feodorovna in a Russian television movie, Звезда Империи.

Personal life 
Grebenkina is married to Yuri Goncharov, with whom she has a son, Ivan, who was born on May 25, 2010. Anna Semenovich is the godmother.

Programs 
(with Azroyan)

Competitive highlights 
GP: Grand Prix

With Azrojan for Armenia and Russia

With Novikov for Russia

With Samovich for Latvia

References

External links 

 Grebenkina-Azroyan.com (archived from original)
 

Russian female ice dancers
Armenian female ice dancers
Figure skaters at the 2006 Winter Olympics
Olympic figure skaters of Armenia
1979 births
Figure skaters from Moscow
Living people